Ilomantis is a genus of praying mantises.

Species
Ilomantis ginsburgae
Ilomantis thalassina, found in Madagascar

See also
List of mantis genera and species

References

Insects of Madagascar
Mantodea genera
Insects described in 1899
Nanomantidae
Endemic fauna of Madagascar